Wayne Henry Broeren (2 March 1933 – 26 March 1991) from Champaign, Illinois, was a United States Paralympic athlete. In the 1960 Summer Paralympics, he competed in multiple sports including dartchery and wheelchair basketball.

In the 1960, he was a member of the winning United States wheelchair basketball team and one half of the pair that won the mixed dartchery, along with Jack Whitman.

In 2004 he was posthumously honoured with a letter by his alma mater, the University of Illinois at Urbana–Champaign.

FAMILY

Wayne married Cecil Marie Creath. They had four children, Stuart, Rachel, Timothy and Thomas.

References

Dartchers at the 1960 Summer Paralympics
Wheelchair basketball players at the 1960 Summer Paralympics
Paralympic gold medalists for the United States
Paralympic bronze medalists for the United States
1933 births
1991 deaths
Medalists at the 1960 Summer Paralympics
Paralympic medalists in wheelchair basketball
Paralympic wheelchair basketball players of the United States
Paralympic medalists in dartchery